Saïda is a commune and the capital city of Saïda Province, Algeria.

Location
Saïda is located in north-western Algeria, on the southern slopes of the Tell Atlas mountain range at the northern fringe of the High Plateaus. The city lies on the right bank of the Wadi Saïda, protected by wooded mountains on the opposite shore that rise steeply from the valley floor to an elevation of some 4,000 feet (1,200 metres).

History
The city's site has been of military importance ever since the Romans built a fort there. Saïda was a stronghold of Abd al-Qadir, the Algerian national leader, who burned the town as French forces approached it in 1844.

Modern Saïda was founded as a French military outpost in 1854 and once housed a regiment of the French Foreign Legion. Its growth was stimulated by the arrival of the Oran-Béchar (narrow-gauge) railway in 1862.

In 2005 the population was 158,856 inhabitants. It is nicknamed the city of waters, because of its abundant underground springs. The area is forested and the main products of the town are cereals, wool, leather and bottled mineral waters.

Transport 
Saïda is served by a narrow gauge railway from Mohammadia; however, a standard gauge line is proposed.

Demographics 
Saïda had a population of 110,865 in 1998, while the population grew to 124,989 in 2008, representing a 12.74% increase.

See also 

 Railway stations in Algeria
 Massacre of Saïda (1881)

References 

Communes of Saïda Province
Cities in Algeria
Province seats of Algeria
1854 establishments in the French colonial empire
Populated places established in 1854
Algeria